Boris Pavlovich Pustyntsev (2 June 1935, Vladivostok – 4 March 2014, Saint Petersburg) was a Russian human rights activist. He was best known as chairman of the charitable organisation St. Petersburg NGO. He was born in Vladivostok, Primorsky Krai, Soviet Union.

Pustyntsev died after a long illness on 4 March 2014 in Saint Petersburg, Russia. He was 78 years old.

References

External links
 Boris Pustyntsev  at Citizens Watch

1935 births
2014 deaths
People from Vladivostok
Soviet translators
20th-century Russian translators
Soviet dissidents
Soviet human rights activists
Soviet prisoners and detainees
Herzen University alumni